Ma Mei Ha is a village in Fanling, in the North District of the New Territories of Hong Kong.

Administration
Ma Mei Ha is a recognized village under the New Territories Small House Policy.

History
Ma Mei Ha was served by the Ma Mei Ha station of the former Sha Tau Kok Railway, which was in operation from 1911 to 1928. Ma Mei Ha station was opened in February 1916.

Education
Ma Mei Ha is in Primary One Admission (POA) School Net 81. Within the school net are multiple aided schools (operated independently but funded with government money); no government schools are in the net.

See also
 Sha Tau Kok Railway
 Ma Mei Ha Leng Tsui

References

External links

 Delineation of area of existing village Ma Mei Ha (Fanling) for election of resident representative (2019 to 2022)

Villages in North District, Hong Kong
Fanling